Al-Abs is a sub-district located in al-Sha'ar District, Ibb Governorate, Yemen. Al-Abs had a population of 2893 as of 2004.

References 

Sub-districts in Ash Sha'ar District